Yazkonağı is a village in the Genç District, Bingöl Province, Turkey. The village is populated by Kurds and had a population of 188 in 2021.

The hamlets of Büyükköy, Çalışlar, Derman, Dikmetaş, Doğanlar, Kanatlı, Kaymakçı, Örtülü, Özkaya, Sarısu, Varlık, Yazıcık and Yünlüce are attached to the village.

References 

Villages in Genç District
Kurdish settlements in Bingöl Province